Norman Gordon Levin Jr. is an American historian, and Emeritus Dwight Morrow Professor of History and American Studies at Amherst College.

He earned a B.A. from Yale University in 1956, and graduated from Harvard University with a Ph.D. in 1967. He has taught at Amherst College since 1964, where he specializes in diplomatic history, Israeli history, and the history of nationalism. He was a recipient of the Bancroft Prize in 1969 for his book Woodrow Wilson and World Politics.

Works

References

Yale University alumni
Harvard University alumni
Amherst College faculty
Living people
21st-century American historians
21st-century American male writers
Year of birth missing (living people)
Bancroft Prize winners
American male non-fiction writers